Zdeněk Chládek (born 25 May 1990 in Teplice) is a Czech boxer. At the 2012 Summer Olympics, he competed in the Men's light welterweight, but was defeated by Mongolian Uranchimegiin Mönkh-Erdene in the first match.

Amateur boxing record
2012 Summer Olympics
Lost to Uranchimegiin Mönkh-Erdene (Mongolia) PTS (12-20)

References

External links
 
 
 
 

1990 births
Living people
People from Teplice
Czech male boxers
Welterweight boxers
Olympic boxers of the Czech Republic
Boxers at the 2012 Summer Olympics
Sportspeople from the Ústí nad Labem Region